Sisco Heights is a census-designated place (CDP) in Snohomish County, Washington, United States. It is located between Arlington and Marysville along State Route 9. As of the 2020 U.S. census, it had a population of 3,140 people.

A post office called Sisco was established in 1902, and remained in operation until 1918. The community has the name of an early settler. Its school closed around 1925.

Geography

References

Census-designated places in Snohomish County, Washington